The Capt. Leonard Tawes House is a historic home located at Crisfield, Somerset County, Maryland, United States. It is a frame two story house begun in the second quarter of the 19th century and extensively altered in the Late Victorian mode through the rest of the century. Also on the property is a garage, a storage shed, a stilted frame dairy, and a gable-roofed frame privy.

The Capt. Leonard Tawes House was listed on the National Register of Historic Places in 1985.

References

External links
, including photo from 1990, at Maryland Historical Trust

Houses in Somerset County, Maryland
Crisfield, Maryland
Houses on the National Register of Historic Places in Maryland
Victorian architecture in Maryland
National Register of Historic Places in Somerset County, Maryland